Filip Ďuriš (born 28 March 1995) is a Slovak footballer who plays as a forward for Slovan Bratislava.

Club career
Ďuriš made his Fortuna Liga's debut for ŠK Slovan Bratislava on 30 November 2014 entering in as a substitute in place of Igor Žofčák against FK Dukla Banská Bystrica.

References

External links
 ŠK Slovan Bratislava profile
 
 Futbalnet profile

1995 births
Living people
Footballers from Bratislava
Slovak footballers
Slovak expatriate footballers
Association football forwards
ŠK Slovan Bratislava players
FK Senica players
Slovak Super Liga players
Slovenian PrvaLiga players
Expatriate footballers in Slovenia
NK Zavrč players